On 30 June 2014, Anatoly Klyan, a Russian Channel One cameraman, was shot and fatally injured while traveling in a bus in Donetsk, Ukraine during the 2014 pro-Russian unrest.

Background 
The pro-Russian separatists of the War in Donbass were the organizers of this trip. There has been conflict between Kyiv forces and pro-Russian separatists in the eastern regions in Ukraine, such as Donetsk and Luhansk. This conflict has caused bloodshed. At the time of Klyan's death, Ukraine was divided between pro-Russians and Ukrainian government supporters. According to a BBC News analysis by Stephen Ennis Klyan's employer has in its reports about Ukraine "sought to further demonise and dehumanise the Ukrainian army".

Personal life 
Anatoly Klyan (born 23 January 1946) was from Russia. He was 68 years old when his death occurred. He was an experienced cameraman who had covered many conflicts in areas such as Nicaragua, Yugoslavia, Angola, Mongolia, and Chechnya. His career in journalism lasted 40 years before his death. Klyan worked for Channel One Russia (Pervy Kanal).

Death 
Anatoly Klyan was fatally wounded while he was riding in a bus that was filled with different soldiers' mothers. The bus was trying to get to a Ukrainian military base in Donetsk, Ukraine. As soon as the bus approached the village called Avdiivka, which is near Donetsk, the bus was suddenly fired upon. The shooting was coming from the Ukrainian forces. Klyan took bullet wounds to his abdomen, but he continued to film on the bus until he told his colleagues that he could no longer carry the camera. Klyan was then placed in a car and taken to the hospital. He later died from his wounds in the local hospital. Klyan had been covering dangerous jobs for his whole career.

Impact 
He was interred at the Troyekurovskoye Cemetery in Moscow with several colleagues who also died in Ukraine in 2014 while reporting. The other journalists buried there are Andrey Stenin, Igor Kornelyuk, and Anton Voloshin. Klyan's death was part of a series of journalist deaths in Ukraine. He was the fifth journalist that was killed in the region in 2014. VGTRK lost two journalists and a technician in another incident in Luhansk on June 17.

Klyan's death, along with other journalists in Ukraine, has caused anger in Moscow, as Moscow has condemned the attacks on it journalists there. Klyan's death also was part of a violation of the Ukrainian-declared ceasefire. Ukrainian soldiers were blamed by the Russian foreign ministry for the attack that occurred. The Russian foreign ministry demanded an investigation into the assault and attack. They demanded a punishment for the ones responsible for everything that happened.

Reactions 
Irina Bokova, director-general of UNESCO, said, "I condemn the murder of Anatoly Klyan. I call on the authorities to conduct an investigation into the murder and bring to account those responsible.
Journalists covering events in Ukraine must have an opportunity to fulfill their professional duty, which is to provide citizens with unbiased information and promote news-based discussions without any fear for their own lives."

See also 
Freedom of the press in Ukraine

References

External links
Nekropole: Anatoly Klyan's burial information

1946 births
2014 deaths
Burials in Troyekurovskoye Cemetery
Deaths by firearm in Ukraine
Journalists killed while covering the war in Donbas
Russian journalists
Gerasimov Institute of Cinematography alumni
People of the 2014 pro-Russian unrest in Ukraine